The United African Apostolic Church is a South African church. Its headquarters is situated in Ha-Mavhunga, a village in the Nzhelele Valley in the province of Limpopo. It is a Pentecostal church that has developed from Pentecostal missionary origins with African beliefs to a synchretic African initiated church. With 1.5 million members it is considered to be the second largest of such churches in South Africa. The church was founded by Bishop Matsea Paulos Mureri in 1912. The late Bishop Matsea Paulos Mureri had traveled to South Africa as part of a Pentecostal mission called the Apostolic Faith Mission. Some of the other missionaries returned to their home countries, but Bishop Matsea Paulos Mureri remained and formed a church called DZIVHA LA MUDZIMU. The name of this church was changed to United African Apostolic Church in 1918. The slogan of the church is "Sea of the World".

The church has no relation to the United Apostolic Church of Europe or the Apostolic Church of South Africa - Apostle Unity, which derived from other roots.

References

Sources
 https://www.uaac.church - United African Apostolic Church website
 http://www.info.gov.za - South African government information

Pentecostal denominations in Africa
Christian denominations in South Africa
Pentecostalism in Africa